Jabal Tuwaiq (Tuwaiq Mountain) is a narrow escarpment that cuts through the plateau of Najd in central Arabia, running approximately  from the southern border of Al-Qasim in the north, to the northern edge of the Empty Quarter desert near Wadi ad-Dawasir in the south. The eastern side slopes downwards gradually, while the western side ends in an abrupt manner. The escarpment can be thought of as a narrow plateau, though the locals refer to it as a jebel ("mount"). Marshall Cavendish used the name "Tuwayr Mountains" to describe mountains of central Arabia, distinct from the Shammar in the north, the Dhofar in the south, and the Hajar to the east.

Many narrow valleys (wadis) run along its sides, such as Wadi Hanifa, and a group of towns lie on its central section, including the Saudi capital, Riyadh. Many settlements have historically existed on either side of it as well, such as those of Sudair and Al-Washm.  The Tweig escarpment is mentioned in Yaqut's 13th century geographical encyclopedia under the name "Al-'Aridh", though for the past few centuries that name has applied only to the central section of it, around Riyadh.

Tourism
In the framework of the recent Saudi tendency to promote entertainment, a group of 100 young hikers joined  Tuwaiq Mountains Challenge in February, 2019. The hikers climbed around 25km.

Petroleum geology

The Arab-D (Upper Jurassic) unit of the Riyadh Group makes up one of the largest petroleum reservoirs in the world. Bureau and Saudi Aramco researchers conducted a high-resolution LIDAR survey of Middle Jurassic outcrops of the Tuwaiq Mountain limestone along the Tuwaiq Mountain Escarpment near the city of Riyadh, Saudi Arabia. This study was a first step towards building a quantitative 3-D geologic model for use as an analog to the lower Arab-D reservoir. Outcrop analogs like this one are critical to understanding reservoir performance on the flow-unit scale (1 to ). Although seismic data allow geologists to gain information about large-scale reservoir compartmentalization (>), flow-unit scale reservoir parameters are far below seismic imaging capability and inter-well spacing.

High-precision laser scans were used as a template upon which stratigraphic interpretation were made allowing researchers to characterize sub-seismic, flow-unit scale reservoir properties of Jurassic bioherms in an effort to better understand optimum production techniques of this enormous reservoir.

Gallery

See also
 Ad-Dahna Desert

References

External links

Mountains of Saudi Arabia